Komil Ismailovich Allamzhonov (born 18 September 1984) is an Uzbek statesman and public figure. He was Press secretary of the President of Uzbekistan, Shavkat Mirziyoyev (December 1, 2017 – October 3, 2018), acting director of the Uzbek Agency for Press and Information (November 28, 2018 – February 2, 2019), acting director of the Agency of Information and Mass Communications under the Administration of the President of the Republic of Uzbekistan (February 4, 2019 – January 29, 2020); and is currently the Chairman of the Board of Trustees of the Public Foundation for Support and Development of the National Mass Media in Uzbekistan (since January 31, 2020).

Early life and education 
Komil Allamjonov was born on September 18, 1984 to a mechanic and a nurse in the Uzbek capital of Tashkent. 

He graduated from Tashkent State Institute of Arts and Culture of Uzbekistan named after M. Uygur (majoring in “Television and Radio Directing”) in 2006; and from Tashkent State Economic University with a degree in Economics in 2010.

Career

Ministry of Emergency Situations and State Tax Committee of Uzbekistan 
He worked as a chief specialist of the Information Service in the Ministry of Emergency Situations, then as a chief specialist of the Information Service in the State Tax Committee, from 2005 to 2009 he worked as an Acting head of the Information Service of the State Tax Committee. From 2009 to 2013, he served as Head of the Information Service of the State Tax Committee, i.e. Press-Secretary of the Committee Chairman.

In 2010, he was awarded the “Oltin Kalam” (Golden feather) award as the head of the best press service in the country.

A multifunctional interactive website of the State Tax Committee soliq.uz was developed and launched under the management of Komil Allamjonov. In 2015, the official website of the committee was named “Best Government Website” in the National Internet Contest. In addition, he also successfully carried out such projects as Tax through the eyes of children and Soliq Info newspaper.

During his activity as the Head of the Information Service of the State Tax Committee, he initiated the creation of the republican newspaper “Solik info” (“Tax info”) in Uzbek and Russian languages. During 2013–2016, he served as its editor-in-chief. The newspaper has become a professional consultant not only for accountants and auditors of Uzbekistan, but also for the staff of the country's taxation bodies.

He also initiated the creation of systematic courses to improve the skills of accountants, where lecturers were directly the heads of departments of the State Tax Committee and the Ministry of Finance. The courses were organized both in Tashkent and in the regions of the country.

Under his management the book-album called “O‘zbekiston soliq tizimi – islohot va rivojlanish yo‘lida” (“State taxation system of Uzbekistan on the way of reform and development”) was published. Also, a fundamental book-album called “Tax system of Uzbekistan in the years of independence” (“O‘zbekiston soliq tizimi mustaqillik yillarida”) dedicated to the 20th anniversary of the formation of taxation authorities was published. The publication presents in detail the history of formation and transformation of the tax system in the territory of the Republic of Uzbekistan from ancient times to the present stage.

He was a member of the working group on development of the Code of Ethics for employees of the taxation authorities of Uzbekistan.

He is a co-author of manuals for educational institutions of different levels: “The ABC of economics and taxes” for grades 1–4, “Lessons on economics and taxes” for grades 5-7 and “Basics of taxation” for grades 8–9. An “Entrepreneurship and the Basics of Business” manual was developed for students of academic lyceums and professional colleges, which includes a special chapter on taxation of business entities. A “Taxes and taxation” textbook has been prepared for universities with a non-economic focus.

From 2009 to 2013, he implemented annual creative show-contests called “Tax Knowledge for Children”, which were held in three stages: district, regional and republican.

Press Secretary of the President 
He was assigned as the press secretary for President Shavkat Mirziyoyev on December 1, 2017 succeeding Asadjon Khodjaev. He was also assigned as a Deputy Head of the Head of State's Executive Office.

Reforms of the presidential press service began and the information vector changed under Allamjonov, which were aimed to allow information to be more accessible between the head of state and state bodies for society.

For the first time, a two-way communication was established, allowing not only to generate official reports for the media, but also allowing the media to request the information they are interested in from the state. Allamjonov was involved in the arrangement of media support for Shavkat Mirziyoyev during his trips around the country and abroad. The coverage of these trips has been taken to a whole new level. In addition to the official part, the reports began to include the meeting nuances, and explanations were given about the meaning of the signed documents. The photo content provided to the media has become thematically wider.

In general, Allamjonov made sure that the work of the president's press service became more open, and the media community could receive prompt and complete information about the external and internal activities of the head of state.

He is an author of projects as Cabinet and Exclusive. The Cabinet is a platform where officials and politicians talked about their goals, achieved results and prospects for their future activities. Within the framework of the Exclusive the floor was given to foreign politicians and financiers on issues of cooperation with the Republic of Uzbekistan.

Also, a number of films were shot by the press service of the President of Uzbekistan and with its assistance. Mr. President (Janob Prezident), in which Shavkat Mirziyoyev shares his thoughts about improving the life of the nation, the importance of the openness of the state for society, the role of the family in human life and other issues. Pages of Truth (Ilohiy yo‘l sari), a movie about the life and work of Imam al-Bukhari, the famous founder of enlightened Islam, who is the author of the collection of hadiths Al-Jami al-Sahih (Sahih) recognized in the world as the second book after the Qur’an. This movie is dedicated to the 1245th anniversary of the birth of the scientist. President’s amnesty (President afv etdi) is about the clemency of 2,700 prisoners.

Komil Allamjonov began to be engaged on pages on Facebook, Twitter and Instagram for the opportunity to exchange ideas, including the development of proposals to improve the work of the press service.

Director of the Agency of Information and Mass Communication 
Komil Allamjonov was assigned to the position of acting director of the Uzbek Agency for Press and Information (UzAPI) on November 28, 2018.

The Agency developed a draft Decree of the President of the Republic of Uzbekistan Regarding additional measures for the further development of the information and mass communication in order to implement the tasks set – to create a new infrastructure for interaction between the media and the government, improve the quality of the media content created in the country, and increase the role of mass media in the social-political and social-economic development of the country. The document entered into force on February 2, 2019.

According to the Decree of the President of the Republic of Uzbekistan UzAPI was reorganized into the Agency of Information and Mass Communication under the Administration of the President of the Republic of Uzbekistan (AIMC). Komil Allamjonov was assigned to the position of acting director of the Agency. The position of the director of the Agency is equal to the first deputy advisor to the President.

Allamjonov was responsible for the development of the state information policy, coordinated the information work of state authorities, ministries, and departments, monitored the implementation of the constitutional rights of citizens to freedom of speech and information, as well as was involved in supporting and assisting in the development of the media, publishing, information and library activities.

As head of the Agency, Allamjonov had a particular focus on enhancing the role of the media in society and ensuring the transparency of public authorities and administration. During this period the following conditions were implemented:
 Press services were created in all government bodies, their activities became more open, the status of press secretaries increased;
 more than 400 press secretaries of government agencies completed advanced training courses at the AIMC;
 128 new media organizations were established;
 registration of mass media radically simplified, this service has begun to be provided in an online format, moving from the category of permissive to notification;
 simplified the accreditation of foreign media in Uzbekistan;
 partnerships with international organizations engaged in the protection of the media and ensuring freedom of speech, such as the OSCE and UNESCO, as well as bilateral cooperation at the interdepartmental level with the relevant bodies of a number of foreign countries like Austria, France, Great Britain, the United Arab Emirates, Belarus, and Russia were established;
 a historic meeting of the President of the Republic of Uzbekistan Shavkat Mirziyoyev with bloggers and journalists was held;
 the media community has adopted the Professional Ethics Code of Journalists of Uzbekistan;
 a program for the development of national content on the Internet was adopted;
 the decriminalization of libel and defamation in press was initiated;
 Initiated and started the development of regulatory legal acts aimed at further liberalization of media, simplifying the registration procedure for industry members.

In response for a call by Harlem Désir, OSCE Representative on Freedom of the Media, to stop blocking media websites in April 2019, owing to the Agency's efforts the following month full access to a number of foreign news resources and websites of human rights organizations was restored in Uzbekistan. These include BBC Uzbek, Voice of America, Amerika Ovozi, Radio Free Europe/Radio Liberty, Eurasianet.org, Deutsche Welle, Amnesty International, Human Rights Watch, Reporters sans frontiers, AsiaTerra, Fergana Agency, etc.

This step had a positive impact on improving the international image of the country, which in the next press freedom rating (for 2019) raised at once by 4 positions.

In general, Uzbekistan has risen in the ranking by 13 positions from 2017 to 2020 and today occupies the 156th place.

An international round table with representatives of the OSCE and permanent representatives of the OSCE participating States to discuss urgent issues of freedom of speech in the country was held on October 11, 2019 in Samarkand. This was the first event on this subject held in Uzbekistan. The event was organized by the Agency of Information and Mass Communication under the Administration of the President of the Republic of Uzbekistan.

Allamjonov initiated work to popularize reading in the country and develop information and library activities. During this period, the Agency began work to restore the network of libraries throughout the country and open new information and library centers. The most significant achievements in this area include the following:
 holding (for the first time) the Book Caravan campaign during which 1.5 million books were distributed;
 beginning of construction of 186 libraries throughout the Republic;
 creation of the National General Education Electronic Library (UZNEL);
 complete reconstruction of the Nodirabegim city library in Namangan city;
 implementation of the Library buses project to provide residents of remote and hard-to-reach settlements with books;
 raising the status of librarians and establishing an official Day for the workers of the information and library sector of Uzbekistan.

Under the management of Allamjonov active work began to support publishing and printing activities.

More specifically, a project has been implemented for the complete reconstruction and technical modernization of the publishing house printing literature in Braille for the blind and visually impaired, a number of cardinal measures have been taken to increase the financial stability of the publishing houses, which are part of the Agency. The country's only college for training specialists for the printing industry was repaired and modernized.

At the initiative of Allamjonov and with his active assistance the implementation of the Ko‘ngil ko‘zi project started in order to create favorable conditions for providing blind and visually impaired people with educational, artistic, scientific and other literature, as well as improving conditions in specialized educational institutions of the Republic. Owing to the project, students gained access to books in different subjects printed in Braille, there have been positive changes in the material and technical base of special boarding schools for the blind and visually impaired.

In February 2019 with the participation and support of Allamjonov the Bolalik kunlarimda project was launched in order to preserve and transfer to future generations samples of folklore, to promote the cultural heritage of the Uzbek people, as well as to create a media product for visually impaired and blind children. As part of the project, famous artists and musicians provide a voice to Uzbek fairy tales and fairy tales of the other nations, which are loaded with free access for everyone on a special telegram channel.

As the head of the AIMC, Allamjonov took part in the preparation of several legislative acts regarding media, freedom of speech, education and other topics.

Public Foundation for Support and Development of the National Mass Media 
In January 2020, a group of journalists and bloggers who initiated the establishment of the Public Foundation for Support and Development of the National Mass Media in Uzbekistan, proposed Allamjonov to hold the office as Chairman on the Board of Trustees. On January 31, 2020 the meeting of the founders approved his assignment.

Entrepreneurship

Allamjonov is the founder of a number of projects, including AvtoTest innovative driving school and the Milliy TV channel. On September 8, 2017 Milliy TV channel held the O‘zbegim festival, where the largest pilaf was prepared, which was officially included in the Guinness Book of Records.

Awards 
 Oltin Qalam (Golden pencil) National award 
 Commemorative pin dedicated to 20 years of independence of the Republic of Uzbekistan
 Commemorative pin dedicated to 25 years of independence of the Republic of Uzbekistan

Personal life 
Married, a father of 4 kids.

References

External links 

Official Website

1984 births
Living people
Politicians from Tashkent
Businesspeople  from Tashkent